Tim Wyskida (born November 13, 1971) is an American drummer, most recognized for his work in the bands Khanate and Blind Idiot God.

Biography
Tim Wyskida began playing drums at the age of twelve, learning jazz technique and composition. In 2000, he joined the band Khanate, a drone metal project formed by Stephen O'Malley and James Plotkin. At the same time, he joined guitarist Andy Hawkins and bassist Gabriel Katz in the band Blind Idiot God, filling the position left by drummer Ted Epstein five years prior. After releasing three albums Khanate disbanded in 2006, with its members pursuing separate musical endeavors. In 2009, Clean Hands Go Foul was issued by Hydra Head and comprised unreleased recordings. Blind Idiot God released their fourth full-length album Before Ever After in February 2015, which comprised material recorded over the thirteen-year span since Wyskida joined as a member.

Discography

References
General

 

Notes

External links

Living people
Blind Idiot God members
Khanate (band) members
Math rock musicians
Post-hardcore musicians
Noise rock musicians
Rock drummers
1971 births
Khlyst (band) members
21st-century drummers